The 10th Infantry Brigade (Lebanon) is a Lebanese Army unit that fought in the Lebanese Civil War, being active from its creation in January 1984.

Origins

In the aftermath of the June–September 1982 Israeli invasion of Lebanon, President Amin Gemayel, convinced that a strong and unified national defense force was a prerequisite to rebuilding the nation, announced plans to raise a 60,000-man army organized into twelve brigades (created from existing infantry regiments), trained and equipped by France and the United States.

Emblem
The Brigade's insignia consists of a brown eagle set on a blue sky background, swooping down on its prey symbolizing rapidity and precision in fixing and eliminating the target. The eye of the eagle symbolizes courage and fearlessness, and an expanded wing denotes protection of friendly forces.

Structure and organization
By 1985 the 10th Brigade comprised a Headquarters' (HQ) battalion, an armoured battalion (104th) equipped with Panhard AML-90 armoured cars, AMX-13 light tanks (replaced in the 1990s by T-55A tanks donated by Syria), US M48A5 main battle tanks (MBTs), three mechanized infantry battalions (101st, 102nd, and 103rd) provisionally issued with US M113 armored personnel carriers (APC), an artillery battalion (105th) equipped with US M114 155 mm howitzers and a support company, the latter divided into one anti-tank and two heavy mortar sections equipped with French Hotchkiss-Brandt TDA MO-120-RT-61 120mm towed heavy mortars. The brigade also fielded a logistics support battalion, equipped with liaison and transport vehicles such as US M151A2 jeeps, Land-Rover long wheelbase series III, Chevrolet C20 and Dodge Ram (1st generation) pickups, plus US M35A2 2½-ton (6x6) military trucks. The Brigade's Headquarters in 1983 was located at the Shukri Ghanem Barracks in the Fayadieh District of East Beirut, and placed under the command of Colonel Nassib Eid, replaced in 1989 by Col. Makhoul Hakmeh. Usually attached to the "Red Berets" of the Para-commando regiment (Arabic: فوج المغاوير transliteration Fauj al-Maghaweer) led by Lieutenant Colonel Yusuf Tahan (later replaced by Colonel Jihad Chahine), the "Green Berets" of the 10th Brigade had their units stationed along the Green Line, manning the Beirut-Damascus highway to the Kfarshima–Ash Choueifat front in the Baabda District. In 1987 both formations were tasked of defending the Fayadieh Military Academy and the large Army barracks complex adjacent to it.

Combat history

The Lebanese Civil War

Commanded by Colonel Nassib Eid and reinforced by a Lebanese Army Commando battalion led by then Major Youssef Tahan, the 10th Brigade during the Mountain War was deployed at east Beirut, where it was held in reserve and ready to support the other LAF Brigades in the field as required.

On February 13, 1984, the 101st Ranger Battalion was rushed to the western portion of the Shahhar region to reinforce the beleaguered units of the 4th Brigade, who were fighting desperately to retain their positions at Aabey, Kfar Matta, Ain Ksour, and Al-Beniyeh while sustaining a wave of ground assaults by the Druze People's Liberation Army (PLA) militia led by Walid Jumblatt.

The Liberation War 1989–1990

During the 1989–1990 Liberation War, the 10th Brigade fought alongside the 8th Brigade against an alliance of Druze PSP/PLA, pro-Syrian Lebanese Forces – Executive Command (LFEC) and Palestinian militias backed by the Syrian Army at the second battle of Souk El Gharb on August 13, 1989. The militias' ground offensive was preceded by a massive and sustained Syrian artillery barrage on the positions held by Aounist troops, who repulsed the assault by inflicting some 20-30 casualties on the PSP/PLA attackers.

The Elimination War 1989–1990

The 13 October 1990 offensive and the end of the civil war

The post-civil war years 1990–present
Upon the end of the war in October 1990, the 10th Infantry Brigade was re-integrated into the structure of the Lebanese Armed Forces (LAF).

See also
 Army of Free Lebanon (AFL)
 Lebanese Armed Forces
 Lebanese Civil War
 Lebanese Forces
 List of weapons of the Lebanese Civil War
 Mountain War (Lebanon)
 Progressive Socialist Party
 People's Liberation Army (Lebanon)
 1st Infantry Brigade (Lebanon)
 2nd Infantry Brigade (Lebanon)
 3rd Infantry Brigade (Lebanon)
 4th Infantry Brigade (Lebanon)
 5th Infantry Brigade (Lebanon)
 6th Infantry Brigade (Lebanon)
 7th Infantry Brigade (Lebanon)
 8th Infantry Brigade (Lebanon)
 9th Infantry Brigade (Lebanon)
 11th Infantry Brigade (Lebanon)
 12th Infantry Brigade (Lebanon)

Notes

References

 Aram Nerguizian, Anthony H. Cordesman & Arleigh A. Burke, The Lebanese Armed Forces: Challenges and Opportunities in Post-Syria Lebanon, Burke Chair in Strategy, Center for Strategic & International Studies (CSIS), First Working Draft: 10 February 2009. – 
 Are J. Knudsen, Lebanese Armed Forces: A United Army for a Divided Country?, CMI INSIGHT, November 2014 No 9, Chr. Michelsen Institute (CMI), Bergen – Norway. – 
 Denise Ammoun, Histoire du Liban contemporain: Tome 2 1943–1990, Éditions Fayard, Paris 2005.  (in French) – Histoire du Liban contemporain, tome 2: 1943–1990
 Edgar O'Ballance, Civil War in Lebanon 1975–92, Palgrave Macmillan, London 1998. 
 Éric Micheletti and Yves Debay, Liban – dix jours aux cœur des combats, RAIDS magazine n.º41, October 1989 issue.  (in French)
James Kinnear, Stephen Sewell & Andrey Aksenov, Soviet T-54 Main Battle Tank, General Military series, Osprey Publishing Ltd, Oxford 2018. 
James Kinnear, Stephen Sewell & Andrey Aksenov, Soviet T-55 Main Battle Tank, General Military series, Osprey Publishing Ltd, Oxford 2019. 
 Joseph Hokayem, L'armée libanaise pendant la guerre: un instrument du pouvoir du président de la République (1975–1985), Lulu.com, Beyrouth 2012. , (in French) – L'armée libanaise pendant la guerre: un instrument du pouvoir du président de la République (1975–1985)
 Ken Guest, Lebanon, in Flashpoint! At the Front Line of Today's Wars, Arms and Armour Press, London 1994, pp. 97–111.  
 Oren Barak, The Lebanese Army – A National institution in a divided society, State University of New York Press, Albany 2009.  – The Lebanese Army: A National Institution in a Divided Society
 Rex Brynen, Sanctuary and Survival: the PLO in Lebanon, Boulder: Westview Press, Oxford 1990.  – Sanctuary and Survival: The PLO in Lebanon
 Robert Fisk, Pity the Nation: Lebanon at War, London: Oxford University Press, (3rd ed. 2001).  – Pity the Nation: Lebanon at War
 Samer Kassis, 30 Years of Military Vehicles in Lebanon, Beirut: Elite Group, 2003. 
 Samuel M. Katz, Lee E. Russel, and Ron Volstad, Armies in Lebanon 1982–84, Men-at-Arms series 165, Osprey Publishing Ltd, London 1985. 
 Samuel M. Katz and Ron Volstad, Arab Armies of the Middle East wars 2, Men-at-Arms series 194, Osprey Publishing Ltd, London 1988. 
 Steven J. Zaloga, Tank battles of the Mid-East Wars (2): The wars of 1973 to the present, Concord Publications, Hong Kong 2003.  – Tank Battles of the Mid-East Wars : (2) The Wars of 1973 to the present
 Thomas Collelo (ed.), Lebanon: a country study, Library of Congress, Federal Research Division, Headquarters, Department of the Army (DA Pam 550–24), Washington D.C., December 1987 (Third edition 1989). – 
 Zachary Sex & Bassel Abi-Chahine, Modern Conflicts 2 – The Lebanese Civil War, From 1975 to 1991 and Beyond, Modern Conflicts Profile Guide Volume II, AK-interactive, 2021. ISBN 8435568306073

External links
 Histoire militaire de l'armée libanaise de 1975 à 1990 (in French)
 Lebanese Armed Forces (LAF) Official Website
 Lebanon Military Guide from GlobalSecurity.org
 CIA – The World Factbook – Lebanon
 Global Fire Power – Lebanon Military Strength
 Lebanon army trying to rearm and modernize itself
 Lebanese Military Wish List 2008/2009 – New York Times

Military units and formations of Lebanon
Military units and formations established in 1984
1984 establishments in Lebanon

bn:লেবাননের সামরিক বাহিনী
fr:Armée libanaise